Barneveld refers to the following places:

Netherlands
 Barneveld (municipality), municipality in Gelderland
 Barneveld (town), town in the municipality

United States
 Barneveld, New York
 Barneveld, Wisconsin

See also
 Van Barneveld